Beverly, Washington, United States, is a small unincorporated community  along the banks of the Columbia River in central Washington state.  The community, which consists of a few hundred residents, is a few miles downriver from Wanapum Dam and is nestled at the base of Sentinel Gap, a water gap in the Saddle Mountains that predates the Columbia River.

History
Beverly was named around 1905 by H.R. Williams, after Beverly, Massachusetts.

Beverly played host to hundreds of railroad workers from 1905-1920s when the Milwaukee Railroad was being built. The Milwaukee constructed a million-dollar bridge across the Columbia just north of Beverly, which was completed in 1909. Supplies to build the bridge were shipped via steamboat from points upstream, and were hauled in on other rail lines. The bridge took nearly two years to complete.

Beverly's early success depended partially on steep grades on the railroad, which meant helper locomotives were required to drive the trains. Colorful brochures were printed and distributed back east by companies touting Beverly's long growing season and sheltered location.

In 1977, the Milwaukee Road filed bankruptcy, and in the early 1980s Washington State removed the rail from east of Beverly to a junction near Royal City, although the hundred-year-old black iron bridge still stands today crossing the river.

During World War II and continuing up to the 1980s, thousands of rail cars moved thorough Beverly en route to the nearby Hanford facility. During that time the station in Beverly (now vacated) was remodeled and enhanced. Sometime in the late 1990s to early 2000s, the train station was demolished.

Beverly today
Beverly remains unincorporated, although it does have its own ZIP code.  The old post office was burned down in 2003 due to arson, the only arson of a post office in the last 50 years in Washington State.  Today, the community is served by a temporary post office building. The building was intended to serve Washington communities in the event of forest fires and other such calamities. The current mobile facility has been in place the last six years to serve the 99321 ZIP code.

Although residents have lobbied to keep their post office, residents in the nearby town of Mattawa have suggested that the post office combine the historical ZIP code with Mattawa's.

Climate
According to the Köppen Climate Classification system, Beverly has a semi-arid climate, abbreviated "BSk" on climate maps.

See also
Beverly Railroad Bridge

References

Unincorporated communities in Grant County, Washington
Unincorporated communities in Washington (state)
Washington (state) populated places on the Columbia River